Yew Tree Tarn is a small lake in the English Lake District situated in between the towns of Ambleside and Coniston. The tarn was formed when the local landowner dammed the Yewdale Beck in the 1930s and stocked the lake with trout. Currently, fishing for brown and rainbow trout is controlled and managed by the Coniston and Torver Angling Association. A usable footpath runs around the periphery of the tarn not bordered by the main road.

In July 2010, volunteers from the South Lakes Rivers Trust and the Coniston and Crake Partnership removed most of the fish from the tarn in order to avoid kill off from low water levels due to a local drought. The fish were moved to the nearby beck.

References

External links
Visit Cumbria

Lakes of the Lake District
South Lakeland District